Aydarken (or more recently Айдаркен) is a city in Batken Region of Kyrgyzstan. It is part of the Kadamjay District. The population of Aydarken amounted to 12,031 in 2021. Aydarken is situated at about 2,000 m elevation, on the northern slopes of the Alay Range.

Population

Aydarken Mercury Plant (KMP)
The Aydarken Mercury Plant (KMP) was the third largest producer of primary mercury in 2005. The ore reserves exploited are located in or near Aydarken. The Minamata Convention on Mercury includes provisions which will eliminate primary mercury mining.

References 

Populated places in Batken Region
Kyrgyzstan–Tajikistan border crossings
Kyrgyzstan